Auriculella castanea is a species of air-breathing tropical land snails, terrestrial pulmonate gastropod mollusks in the family Achatinellidae. This species is endemic to the United States.

References

Molluscs of the United States
Auriculella
Gastropods described in 1853
Taxonomy articles created by Polbot